Anatoly Nikolayevich Bulakov (February 3, 1930 – September 19, 1994) was a boxer from the USSR, who won the bronze medal in the flyweight division (– 51 kg) at the 1952 Summer Olympics in Helsinki.

He trained at Dynamo in Moscow. Bulakov competed in flyweight. He was the USSR Champion from 1949 to 1954, bronze medal winner at the 1953 European Championship and 1959 Summer Universiade Champion. During his career he won 126 fights out of 130.

1952 Olympic results
 Round of 32: defeated Hein van der Zee (Netherlands) on points, 3-0
 Round of 16: defeated Aristide Pozzali (Italy) on points, 3-0
 Quarterfinal: defeated Dai Dower (Great Britain) on points, 2-1
 Semifinal: lost to Edgar Basel (Germany) on points, 1-2 (was awarded a bronze medal)

References

External links
 
 
 
 Anatoli Bulakov's profile at Sport-Strana.ru 

1930 births
1994 deaths
Flyweight boxers
Boxers at the 1952 Summer Olympics
Olympic boxers of the Soviet Union
Olympic bronze medalists for the Soviet Union
Dynamo sports society athletes
Olympic medalists in boxing
Soviet male boxers
Medalists at the 1952 Summer Olympics